Beta Pavonis, Latinised from β Pavonis, is a single, white-hued star in the southern constellation of Pavo. It can be seen with the naked eye, having an apparent visual magnitude of 3.42. Based upon an annual parallax shift of 24.14 mas as seen from Earth, it is located 135 light-years from the Sun. It is moving away from the Sun with a radial velocity of +4 km/s. Beta Pavonis is a member of the Ursa Major Moving Group, a set of stars that share a similar motion through space.

Zorec and Royer (2012) list a stellar classification for this star of A5 IV, indicating it is an evolving subgiant star that has consumed the hydrogen at its core and has begun to expand onto the red giant branch. However, Houk (1979) listed a more evolved class of A7 III, suggesting it is already a giant star. It has about 2.3 times the Sun's radius and 2.51 times the mass of the Sun. At the estimated age of 305 million years, the star still has a relatively high rate of spin, having a projected rotational velocity of 75 km/s.

References

A-type subgiants
A-type giants
Ursa Major Moving Group

Pavo (constellation)
Pavonis, Beta
Durchmusterung objects
197051
102395
7913